The discography of the American industrial rock band Snake River Conspiracy consists of one studio album, two extended plays, four singles, three B-sides, three promotional releases, three music videos and twelve unreleased songs.

Albums

Studio albums

Unreleased albums

Extended plays

Singles

Music videos

Promotional releases

Samplers

Promotional singles

B-sides

Unreleased songs 
These songs were derived from the band's unreleased second album, SRC2.

Notes

References 

Discographies of American artists
Rock music discographies